The Black Flame was a magazine published by the Church of Satan. It was launched in 1989, when another of the Church's publications, The Cloven Hoof, went on hiatus.  Originally, The Black Flame was a quarterly newsletter, but it then evolved into a bi-annual publication. The publisher was Hell’s Kitchen Productions Inc. The magazine ceased publication following #16 which appeared in 2005.

References

External links
 The Black Flame section of the Church of Satan website

Biannual magazines published in the United States
Quarterly magazines published in the United States
Religious magazines published in the United States
Defunct magazines published in the United States
Church of Satan
Magazines established in 1989
Magazines disestablished in 2005
Newsletters